H15, H.15 or H-15 may refer to :
 H-15 (Michigan county highway), a road in the United States
 Highway H15 (Ukraine), a road in Ukraine
 British NVC community H15, a type of heath community in the British National Vegetation Classification
 , a 1934 British Royal Navy E class destroyer
 , a World War II British Royal Navy R class destroyer
 LSWR H15 class, a 1914 British class of steam locomotives
 Federal Reserve Statistical Release H.15